David Cayley is a Toronto-based Canadian writer and broadcaster, who is known for documenting philosophy of prominent thinkers of the 20th century - Ivan Illich, Northrop Frye, George Grant, and Rene Girard. His work has been broadcast on  CBC Radio One's  programme Ideas.

List of works
 Ivan Illich: An Intellectual Journey (2021)  (Pennsylvania: Penn State University Press) 
 Ideas on the Nature of Science (2009)  (Toronto: Goose Lane Editions) 
 The Rivers North of the Future: The Testament of Ivan Illich  (2005)  (Toronto: Anansi Press)
 Puppet Uprising (2003)  (Toronto: CBC Radio Canada)
 Corruption of Christianity Illich, Ivan (Author) Cayley, David (Editor) (2000)  (Toronto: Anansi Press)
 Northrop Frye in Conversation interviews with Northrop Frye (2000)  (Toronto: Anansi Press)
 Expanding Prison (1998)  (Toronto: Anansi Press)
 George Grant in Conversation interviews with George Grant (1995)  (Toronto: Anansi Press)
 Ivan Illich in Conversation interviews with Ivan Illich (1992)  (Toronto: Anansi Press)

Series on CBC's Ideas
 "How to Think About Science" (2007) CBC Radio
 "The Myth of the Secular" (2012) CBC Radio
 "After Atheism: New Perspectives on God and religion" (2014) CBC Radio

Ideas on the Nature of Science

Edited transcripts from the radio series have been turned into a book, published in 2009 by Gooselane Press as Ideas on the Nature of Science.

How To Think About Science - Radio Series Episodes

 "Bread and Puppet Theatre"  (2003) CBC Radio

External links
 "Review of The Rivers North of the Future"
 "Outdoor rinks hostage to icy political calculation" article in Toronto Star
 "davidcayley.com" David Cayley Official Website

Living people
Canadian non-fiction writers
Canadian radio personalities
Year of birth missing (living people)